The 2018 OFC Women's Nations Cup is an international football tournament being held in New Caledonia from 18 November to 1 December 2018. The eight national teams involved in the tournament were required to register a squad of up to 23 players, including two goalkeepers. Only players in these squads are eligible to take part in the tournament.

The position listed for each player is per the official squad list published by the OFC. The age listed for each player is on 18 November 2018, the first day of the tournament. The numbers of caps and goals listed for each player do not include any matches played after the start of tournament. The nationality for each club reflects the national association (not the league) to which the club is affiliated. A flag is included for coaches that are of a different nationality than their own national team.

Group A

New Caledonia
 Coach: Kamali Fitialeata

Papua New Guinea
 Coach: Peter Gunemba

Samoa
 Coach:  Nicola Demaine

Tahiti
 Coach: Stéphanie Spielmann

Group B

Cook Islands
 Coach: Tuka Tisam

Fiji
 Coach: Marika Rodu

New Zealand
 Coach:  Tom Sermanni

Tonga
 Coach: Christian Koaneti

References

Squads
2018